Eri Davidson Woodbury (May 30, 1837 – April 14, 1928) was a Union Army officer during the American Civil War. He received the Medal of Honor for gallantry during the Battle of Cedar Creek fought near Middletown, Virginia on October 19, 1864. The battle was the decisive engagement of Major General Philip Sheridan’s  Valley Campaigns of 1864 and was the largest battle fought in the Shenandoah Valley.

Woodbury graduated from Dartmouth College in 1863. He enlisted in the army in December of that year, and mustered out in June 1865  After the war, he taught at Cheshire Academy for 38 years, eventually becoming its headmaster.

Medal of Honor citation
“The President of the United States of America, in the name of Congress, takes pleasure in presenting the Medal of Honor to Sergeant Eri Davidson Woodbury, United States Army, for extraordinary heroism on 19 October 1864, while serving with Company E, 1st Vermont Cavalry, in action at Cedar Creek, Virginia. During the regiment's charge when the enemy was in retreat Sergeant Woodbury encountered four Confederate infantrymen retreating. He drew his saber and ordered them to surrender, overcoming by his determined actions their willingness to further resist. They surrendered to him together with their rifles and 12th North Carolina (Confederate States of America) regimental flag.”

Woodbury was sent to Washington, D.C. with the captured Confederate battle flag. He was personally introduced to Secretary of War Edwin M. Stanton by General George Custer. Stanton personally presented the Medal of Honor to Woodbury. Sergeant Woodbury was also promoted to First Lieutenant and was mustered out as a Brevet Captain in Jun 1865.

See also

List of Medal of Honor recipients
List of American Civil War Medal of Honor recipients: T-Z

References

External links
Military Times Hall of Valor

Vermont in the Civil War

1837 births
1928 deaths
People of New Hampshire in the American Civil War
People of Vermont in the American Civil War
People of Connecticut in the American Civil War
Union Army officers
United States Army Medal of Honor recipients
American Civil War recipients of the Medal of Honor
Military personnel from Connecticut
People from Francestown, New Hampshire